The Spirit King is a character in the fictional DC Universe; he was initially an adversary of the original Mister Terrific, but later expanded to be a threat to the entire Justice Society, particularly the Spectre and the Flash.

The character was created for a murder mystery story in the 1970s and retroactively introduced into the fictional history of the character Mister Terrific.

Fictional character biography
Back in the original Golden Age of heroes, Roger Romaine began to kill women in the city of Portsmouth, Washington, believing that he would thus absorb their spirits and gain command of the dead to use against the living world. Although he was hunted by Mister Terrific, he was eventually banished to Hell by the Spectre, despite Terrific's insistence that the families of Romaine's victims deserved to see him stand trial.

Now trapped in Hell, Romaine made a deal with the demon Shaitan, gaining the power to possess and use the bodies of others in exchange for giving Shaitan the chance to confront the Spectre. Returning to Earth shortly before the annual meeting with the Justice Society and the Justice League on the League's satellite headquarters, the Spirit King subsequently possessed the body of Jay Garrick, the first Flash, and was able to travel to the satellite. Although Mister Terrific deduced his true identity, the villain killed Terrific, using Flash's super speed so nobody could see who the killer was. Eventually discovering the truth, the JSA chased the Spirit King to Earth, but in the ensuing battle, the Spirit King assumed control of Doctor Fate, and, together with Shaitan, almost succeeded in defeating the Spectre. However, the spirit of Mister Terrific returned and disrupted the connection between Romaine and Shaitan, banishing the Spirit King to Hell once again, although Jay was left feeling guilty about his inability to stop the King using him to kill his friend.

Years later, after the Justice Society had disbanded and reformed, they found themselves investigating a spree of violence on the streets of Portsmouth, one of the victims being a friend of Doctor Mid-Nite. While Mid-Nite and the new Mister Terrific debated religion in a church, they were visited by Hal Jordan, former Green Lantern and the current Spectre, who revealed that his attempts to turn the Spectre's mission to one of redemption as opposed to one of vengeance had weakened the Spectre's hold on the spirits he had once damned. As a result, all those souls that had been condemned to Hell by the Spectre had escaped, with Romaine leading them against the world, and the JSA his first targets. As the JSA tried to hold their own against the undead army, Romaine once again possessed the Flash, using him to attack Sentinel and seriously injure Mister Terrific. Seeing the near-murder of his friends, Jordan rejected his mission of redemption, concluding that it was only helping himself, and returned to his role of vengeance, banishing Romaine and his army back to Hell.

References

See also
List of Justice League enemies

Characters created by Gerry Conway
Characters created by Dick Dillin
Comics characters introduced in 1979
DC Comics supervillains
Fictional ghosts
Fictional mass murderers
DC Comics undead characters